Novocheboksarsk is a city in Chuvashia, Russia, located on the southern bank of the Volga River, about  east of Cheboksary, the capital of the republic. Population:

History
It was founded in 1960 when a trend of building satellite cities started. Starting from barren land, the growing town absorbed surrounding villages, such as Yelnikovo, Urakovo, Yandashevo, Anatkasy, and Tsygankasy.

November 18, 1960 is customarily considered to be the city's birthday. City status was granted in 1971. The city grew at a rapid rate; in 1978 it covered , and on October 29, 1983 it passed 100,000 inhabitants.

Construction began on vacant land. Expanding, it incorporated the neighboring villages of Yelnikovo, Yandashevo, Anatkasy, Tsygankasy, etc. On December 27, 1971 the Presidium of the Supreme Soviet of the Russian SFSR issued the Decree "On Granting the City of Novocheboksarsk of the Chuvash ASSR the Status of a City Under Republic Jurisdiction".

It was designed by architects from Leningrad. One of its first streets was Vinokurova, site of a 1985 monument to I. S. Semenovu. Another monument commemorates victims of the Great Patriotic War. Another honors Vladimir I of Kiev.

The city consists of three residential areas comprising eighteen microdistricts.

 The available housing as of August 1, 1999 was 458 apartment houses: 39,452 apartments plus 4,033 rooms.

Administrative and municipal status
Within the framework of administrative divisions, it is, together with the village of Oldeyevo, incorporated as the city of republic significance of Novocheboksarsk—an administrative unit with the status equal to that of the districts. As a municipal division, the city of republic significance of Novocheboksarsk is incorporated as Novocheboksarsk Urban Okrug.

Media
The journal of the World Organisation of Culture of Health (″World Health Culture Organization″) is based in Novocheboksarsk. In 1995, Victor Skumin became the first editor-in-chief of the journal To Health via Culture. The journal received an International Standard Serial Number (ISSN) 0204-3440. The main topics of the magazine are the dissemination of ideas of Culture of Health, holistic medicine, Agni Yoga and Roerichism.

Transportation

Local public transportation 
Novocheboksarsk has a trolleybus system, buses and minibuses. The trolleybus fare is 24 cents, and the bus fare is 31 cents. The most popular is the minibus, which has 7 routes and 95 minibuses on them. The trolleybus system consists of 5 routes with a length of 121 kilometers and 56 trolleybuses on them.

Commercial taxi services are available too.

Twin towns and sister cities

Novocheboksarsk is twinned with:
 Klimovsk, Russia
 Sterlitamak, Russia
 Žatec, Czech Republic

References

Notes

Sources

Cities and towns in Chuvashia
Populated places on the Volga
Cities and towns built in the Soviet Union
Populated places established in 1960